Four ships of the Royal Navy have borne the name HMS Akbar, the Arabic word for Great. Two others were planned but never commissioned:

HMS Akbar was to have been a 74-gun third rate. She was laid down in 1807 but was cancelled in 1809.
HMS Akbar was a 54-gun fourth rate, the former East Indiaman Marquis Cornwallis, launched in 1801 and purchased in 1805. and renamed Cornwallis. She was renamed HMS Akbar in 1811 and used as a troopship. She was used for harbour service from 1824 and was sold in 1862.
HMS Akbar was a training ship launched in 1816 as the 74-gun third rate . She was renamed HMS Wellington in 1816 and Akbar in 1862. She was sold for breaking up in 1906.
 was a wooden paddle frigate launched in 1841 and sold in 1859. 
She became a training ship in 1904 and was renamed HMS Indus II, and then HMS Akbar in 1915. She was sold in 1921.
She was launched in 1942 but retained for service with the US Navy.

See also 

 List of things named after Akbar

Royal Navy ship names